A Dyson sphere is a hypothetical megastructure that encompasses a star and captures a large percentage of its solar power output. The concept is a thought experiment that attempts to imagine how a spacefaring civilization would meet its energy requirements once those requirements exceed what can be generated from the home planet's resources alone. Because only a tiny fraction of a star's energy emissions reaches the surface of any orbiting planet, building structures encircling a star would enable a civilization to harvest far more energy. 

The first modern imagining of such a structure was by Olaf Stapledon in his science fiction novel Star Maker (1937), in which he described "every solar system... surrounded by a gauze of light-traps, which focused the escaping solar energy for intelligent use". The concept was later explored by the physicist Freeman Dyson in his 1960 paper "Search for Artificial Stellar Sources of Infrared Radiation". Dyson speculated that such structures would be the logical consequence of the escalating energy needs of a technological civilization and would be a necessity for its long-term survival. Spheres detected in astronomical searches could be an indicator of extraterrestrial life, with different types of sphere and their energy-harvesting ability corresponding to levels of technological advancement on the Kardashev scale.

Since Dyson's 1960 paper, many variant designs involving building an artificial structure or series of structures to encompass a star have been proposed in exploratory engineering or described in science fiction, often under the name "Dyson sphere". These proposals have not been limited to solar-power stations, with many involving habitation or industrial elements. Fictional depictions often describe a solid shell of matter enclosing a star – an arrangement considered by Dyson himself to be implausible. In May 2013, at the Starship Century Symposium in San Diego, Dyson reiterated his regret that the concept had been named after him.

Origins 

The physicist and mathematician Freeman Dyson is credited with being the first to formalize the concept of what became known as the Dyson sphere in his 1960 Science paper "Search for Artificial Stellar Sources of Infra-Red Radiation". Dyson theorized that as the energy requirements of an advanced technological civilization increased, there would come a time when it would need to systematically harvest the energy from its local star on a large scale. He speculated that this could be done via a system of structures (which he referred to as a shell) orbiting the star, designed to intercept and collect its energy. Dyson did not detail how such a system could be constructed, but argued that as the structure would result in the large-scale conversion of starlight into far-infrared radiation, an earth-based search for sources of infrared radiation could identify stars supporting intelligent life.

However, Dyson was not the first to advance this idea. He was inspired by the 1937 science fiction novel Star Maker, by Olaf Stapledon.

Feasibility 
Although such megastructures are theoretically possible, building a stable Dyson sphere system is currently far beyond humanity's engineering capacity. The number of craft required to obtain, transmit, and maintain a complete Dyson sphere exceeds present-day industrial capabilities. George Dvorsky has advocated the use of self-replicating robots to overcome this limitation in the relatively near term. Some have suggested that such habitats could be built around white dwarfs and even pulsars.

Variants 
 In response to letters prompted by some papers, Dyson replied, "A solid shell or ring surrounding a star is mechanically impossible. The form of 'biosphere' which I envisaged consists of a loose collection or swarm of objects traveling on independent orbits around the star".

Dyson swarm 

 It consists of a large number of independent constructs (usually solar power satellites and space habitats) orbiting in a dense formation around the star. This construction approach has advantages: components could be sized appropriately, and it can be constructed incrementally. 

 More-complex patterns with more rings would intercept more of the star's output, but would result in some constructs eclipsing others periodically when their orbits overlap. 

Such a cloud of collectors would alter the light emitted by the star system (see below). However, the disruption compared to a star's overall natural emitted spectrum would most likely be too small for Earth-based astronomers to observe.

Dyson bubble 

 Because the ratio of radiation pressure to the force of gravity from a star is constant regardless of the distance (provided the satellite has an unobstructed line-of-sight to the surface of its star), 

The practicality of this approach is questionable with modern material science, but cannot yet be ruled out. A 100% reflective satellite deployed around the Sun would need to have an overall density of 0.78 grams per square meter of sail. To illustrate the low mass of the required materials, consider that the total mass of a bubble of such material 1 AU in radius would be about 2.17 kg, which is about the same mass as the asteroid Pallas. Another illustration:

Dyson shell 

The variant of the Dyson sphere most often depicted in fiction is the "Dyson shell": a uniform solid shell of matter around the star. 

This would intercept the full 384.6 yottawatts (3.846 × 1026 watts) of the Sun's output. Non-shell designs would intercept less, but the shell variant represents the maximum possible energy captured for the Solar System at this point of the Sun's evolution. This is approximately 33 trillion times the power consumption of humanity in 1998, which was 12 terawatts.

There are several serious theoretical difficulties with the solid shell variant of the Dyson sphere:

Such a shell would have no net gravitational interaction with its englobed star (see shell theorem), and could drift in relation to the central star. If such movements went uncorrected, they could eventually result in a collision between the sphere and the star—most likely with disastrous results. Such structures would need either some form of propulsion to counteract any drift, or some way to repel the surface of the sphere away from the star.

For the same reason, such a shell would have no net gravitational interaction with anything else inside it. The contents of any biosphere placed on the inner surface of a Dyson shell would not be attracted to the sphere's surface and would simply fall into the star. It has been proposed that a biosphere could be contained between two concentric spheres, placed on the interior of a rotating sphere (in which case, the force of artificial "gravity" is perpendicular to the axis of rotation, causing all matter placed on the interior of the sphere to pool around the equator, effectively rendering the sphere a Niven ring for purposes of habitation, but still fully effective as a radiant-energy collector) or placed on the outside of the sphere where it would be held in place by the star's gravity. In such cases, some form of illumination would have to be devised, or the sphere made at least partly transparent, because the star's light would otherwise be completely hidden.

If assuming a radius of 1 AU, then the compressive strength of the material forming the sphere would have to be immense to prevent implosion due to the star's gravity. Any arbitrarily selected point on the surface of the sphere can be viewed as being under the pressure of the base of a dome 1 AU in height under the Sun's gravity at that distance. Indeed, it can be viewed as being at the base of an infinite number of arbitrarily selected domes, but because much of the force from any one arbitrary dome is counteracted by those of another, the net force on that point is immense, but finite. No known or theorized material is strong enough to withstand this pressure, and form a rigid, static sphere around a star. It has been proposed by Paul Birch (in relation to smaller "Supra-Jupiter" constructions around a large planet rather than a star) that it may be possible to support a Dyson shell by dynamic means similar to those used in a space fountain. Masses travelling in circular tracks on the inside of the sphere, at velocities significantly greater than orbital velocity, would press outwards on magnetic bearings due to centrifugal force. For a Dyson shell of 1 AU radius around a star with the same mass as the Sun, a mass travelling ten times the orbital velocity (297.9 km/s) would support 99 (a = v2/r) times its own mass in additional shell structure.

Also if assuming a radius of 1 AU, there may not be sufficient building material in the Solar System to construct a Dyson shell. Anders Sandberg estimates that there is 1.82 kg of easily usable building material in the Solar System, enough for a 1 AU shell with a mass of 600 kg/m2—about 8–20 cm thick on average, depending on the density of the material. This includes the hard-to-access cores of the gas giants; the inner planets alone provide only 11.79 kg, enough for a 1 AU shell with a mass of just 42 kg/m2.

Bubbleworld 
A bubbleworld is an artificial construct that consists of a shell of living space around a sphere of hydrogen gas. The shell contains air, people, houses, furniture, etc. The idea was conceived to answer the question, "What is the largest space colony that can be built?" 

Theoretically, any gas giant could be enclosed in a solid shell; at a certain radius the surface gravity would be terrestrial, and energy could be provided by tapping the thermal energy of the planet.

Stellar engine 
Stellar engines are a class of hypothetical megastructures whose purpose is to extract useful energy from a star, sometimes for specific purposes. For example, Matrioshka brains extract energy for purposes of computation; Shkadov thrusters extract energy for purposes of propulsion. Some of the proposed stellar engine designs are based on the Dyson sphere.

Search for megastructures 
In Dyson's original paper, he speculated that sufficiently advanced extraterrestrial civilizations would likely follow a similar power-consumption pattern to that of humans, and would eventually build their own sphere of collectors. Constructing such a system would make such a civilization a Type II Kardashev civilization.

The existence of such a system of collectors would alter the light emitted from the star system. Collectors would absorb and reradiate energy from the star. The wavelength(s) of radiation emitted by the collectors would be determined by the emission spectra of the substances making them up, and the temperature of the collectors. Because it seems most likely that these collectors would be made up of heavy elements not normally found in the emission spectra of their central star, there would be atypical wavelengths of light for the star's spectral type. If the percentage of the star's output thus filtered or transformed by this absorption and reradiation was significant, it could be detected at interstellar distances.

Given the amount of energy available per square meter at a distance of 1 AU from the Sun, it is possible to calculate that most known substances would be reradiating energy in the infrared part of the electromagnetic spectrum. Thus, a Dyson sphere, constructed by life forms not dissimilar to humans, who dwelled in proximity to a Sun-like star, made with materials similar to those available to humans, would most likely cause an increase in the amount of infrared radiation in the star system's emitted spectrum. Hence, Dyson selected the title "Search for Artificial Stellar Sources of Infrared Radiation" for his published paper.

SETI has adopted these assumptions in their search, looking for such "infrared heavy" spectra from solar analogs.  Fermilab has an ongoing survey for such spectra by analyzing data from the Infrared Astronomical Satellite (IRAS). Identifying one of the many infrared sources as a Dyson sphere would require improved techniques for discriminating between a Dyson sphere and natural sources. Fermilab discovered 17 potential "ambiguous" candidates, of which four have been named "amusing but still questionable". Other searches also resulted in several candidates, which are, however, unconfirmed.

On 14 October 2015, Planet Hunters' citizen scientists discovered unusual light fluctuations of the star KIC 8462852, captured by the Kepler Space Telescope. The star was nicknamed "Tabby's Star" after Tabetha S. Boyajian — the initial study's lead author. The phenomenon raised speculation that a Dyson sphere may have been discovered. Further analysis based on data through the end of 2017 showed wavelength-dependent dimming consistent with dust but not an opaque object such as an alien megastructure, which would block all wavelengths of light equally.

Cultural references 

A precursor to the concept of Dyson spheres was featured in the 1937 novel Star Maker by Olaf Stapledon. Fictional Dyson spheres are typically solid structures forming a continuous shell around the star in question, although Dyson himself considered that prospect mechanically implausible and instead proposed multiple separate objects independently orbiting the star. It is a type of Big Dumb Object.

Dyson spheres appear as a background element in many works of fiction, such as in the 1964 novel The Wanderer by Fritz Leiber where aliens enclose multiple stars in this way. Dyson spheres are depicted in the 1975–1983 book series Saga of Cuckoo by Frederik Pohl and Jack Williamson, and one functions as the setting of Bob Shaw's 1975 novel Orbitsville and its sequels. Variations on the concept include the single circular band of a Dyson sphere without the rest of the sphere in Larry Niven's 1970 novel Ringworld, the halved Dyson sphere in the 2012 novel Bowl of Heaven by Gregory Benford and Niven, and nested Dyson spheres—also known as a Matrioshka brain—as in Colin Kapp's 1980s Cageworld series and Brian Stableford's 1979–1990 Asgard trilogy.

See also

References

External links 

 Dyson sphere FAQ
 Toroidal Dyson swarms simulations using Java applets
 FermiLab: IRAS-based whole sky upper limit on Dyson spheres, with a notable appendix on Dyson sphere engineering

Astronomy projects
Energy development
Exploratory engineering
Freeman Dyson
History of science
Hypothetical astronomical objects
Hypothetical technology
Megastructures
Philosophy of science
Philosophy of technology
Proposed space stations
Science fiction themes
Search for extraterrestrial intelligence
Solar power
Space colonization
Thought experiments